Robert Stafford (1913–2006) was a U.S. Senator from Vermont. Senator Stafford may also refer to:

Ronald B. Stafford (1936–2005), New York State Senate